1807 Slovakia, provisional designation , is a stony asteroid and slow rotator from the inner regions of the asteroid belt, approximately 9 kilometers in diameter. It was discovered on 20 August 1971, by Slovak astronomer Milan Antal at Skalnaté pleso Observatory in the High Tatras mountains of Slovakia and named after the Slovak Republic.

Orbit and classification 

The asteroid orbits the Sun in the inner main-belt at a distance of 1.8–2.6 AU once every 3 years and 4 months (1,213 days). Its orbit has an eccentricity of 0.18 and an inclination of 3° with respect to the ecliptic.

Physical characteristics 

In the SMASS classification, Slovakia is a common stony S-type asteroid.

Slow rotator 
  
Slovakia has an exceptionally long rotation period of 308 hours with a high brightness variation of 1.10 magnitude. The Collaborative Asteroid Lightcurve Link (CALL) adopts a period of 308.6 hours with an amplitude of 1.1 magnitude.

Diameter and albedo 

According to the survey carried out by NASA's Wide-field Infrared Survey Explorer with its subsequent NEOWISE mission, Slovakia measures 9.14 kilometers in diameter, and its surface has an albedo of 0.31, while CALL assumes a standard albedo for stony asteroids of 0.20 and calculates a diameter of 9.40 kilometers with an absolute magnitude of 12.5

Naming 

This minor planet was named in honor of the now independent state of Slovakia (Slovak Republic), the country where the discovering observatory is located. At the time Slovakia was still part of the socialistic republic of Czechoslovakia that was formed after World War I and lasted until the end of the Cold War (also see 2315 Czechoslovakia). The official  was published by the Minor Planet Center on 15 June 1973.

References

External links 
 Asteroid Lightcurve Database (LCDB), query form (info )
 Dictionary of Minor Planet Names, Google books
 Asteroids and comets rotation curves, CdR – Observatoire de Genève, Raoul Behrend
 Discovery Circumstances: Numbered Minor Planets (1)-(5000) – Minor Planet Center
 
 

001807
Discoveries by Milan Antal
Named minor planets
001807
001807
19710820